The following is an alphabetical list of artists who have been categorized as Latin trap:

 A.Chal
Almighty
 Andy Rivera
 Anitta
 Anuel AA
 Arcángel
 Bad Bunny
 Bryant Myers
 Brytiago
 Cazzu
 Cosculluela
 De La Ghetto
 Duki
 Ele A el Dominio
Faraón Love Shady
 Farruko
 Fuego
 J Álvarez
 Jhayco
 Jon Z
 Karol G
 Khea
 Lunay
 Maikel Delacalle
 Maluma
 Messiah
 Miky Woodz 
 Myke Towers
 Nicky Jam
 Noriel
 Ozuna
 Renata Flores
 Paulo Londra
 Tali Goya
 Zaramay

References 

Lists of hip hop musicians